I Corrupt All Cops ( is a 2009 Hong Kong crime drama film directed by Wong Jing. The English initials of the film spells out ICAC.

Plot
During the time Hong Kong was under British rule, there was a dark age when corruption and bribery were the order of the day. Chinese Chief Inspector Lak (Tony Leung Ka-fai) together with his gang, Unicorn (Anthony Wong), Gale (Eason Chan) and Gold (Wong Jing) laundered massive sums thereby making Hong Kong an empire of graft. Whenever they failed to apprehend the felons, Unicorn would get innocent victims, like Bong (Alex Fong), to admit to the crimes.

Gale had nine "wives", all of whom were actually mistresses of other constables. Only Lily (Kate Tsui) was loyal to him, but Gale was fascinated by the female drug lord, Rose (Liu Yang). Lak was found having an affair with Unicorn's mistress (Natalie Meng Yao). Unicorn beat up Lak and was demoted to stand guard at a reservoir.

In the early 1970s, the Governor of Hong Kong decided to clean up the police force. The ICAC was established, whose operation branch was headed by Yim (Bowie Lam). Bong and Unicorn also joined the ICAC. Despite threats of violence and intimidation, they managed to bring about the downfall of the empire of graft.

Cast
 Tony Leung Ka-fai - Chief Inspector Lak Chui
 Anthony Wong - Unicorn Tang
 Eason Chan - Gale Chan
 Bowie Lam - Inspector Yim
 Alex Fong - Bong
 Wong Jing - Gold
 Kate Tsui - Lily
 Kong Lin - Lak Chui's wife
 Natalie Meng Yao - Unicorn's mistress
 Liu Yang - Rose
 Paw Hee-Ching - Bong's mother
 Timmy Hung - Pastry
 Samuel Leung - Fai
 Simon Waikiss - Donald
 Alan Chui Chung-San - Limp 
 Mars - Det. Sgt Major at meeting
 Johnny Cheung - Det. Sgt Major at meeting

Release
I Corrupt All Cops was released in Hong Kong theaters on 30 April 2009. The U.S DVD edition of the film was released on 13 November 2009. Special features included are trailers, making of and deleted scenes.

References

External links

I Corrupt All Cops at the Hong Kong Movie Database
I Corrupt All Cops at the Hong Kong Cinemagic

2009 films
2009 crime drama films
2009 action films
Hong Kong crime films
Hong Kong action films
Police detective films
2000s Cantonese-language films
Films directed by Wong Jing
Films set in Hong Kong
Films shot in Hong Kong
Films about police misconduct
Films about police corruption
Films about police brutality
2000s Hong Kong films